Henry Baerer (1837-1908) was an American sculptor born in Munich, Germany.

Works include:
 two versions of the Puck magazine mascot on the Puck Building, New York (1886)
 Bronze bust of Beethoven for a monument in Central Park (1894) 
 Nearly identical bust in Prospect Park
 Bust of John Howard Payne in Prospect Park, Brooklyn 
 Statue of Edward Brush Fowler in Fort Greene Park, Brooklyn
 Bust of Franz Schubert in Fairmount Park, Philadelphia
 Statue of Gouverneur K. Warren in Grand Army Plaza, Brooklyn, New York
 Bronze statue of Conrad Poppenhusen in College Point, Queens, New York

Gallery of works

References 

1837 births
1908 deaths
Artists from Munich
Artists from New York City
German emigrants to the United States
Sculptors from New York (state)